Michael John O'Brien (19 September 1851 – 26 October 1940) was a railway builder, industrialist and philanthropist. He was named to the Senate of Canada in 1918. He was a founder of the town of Renfrew, Ontario.

Early life 
O'Brien was born in Lochaber, Nova Scotia to Irish immigrant John O'Brien (1799 - 1869) and his wife, Mary Elizabeth Cleary O'Brien (1832 - 1900), daughter of Michael Cleary and Elizabeth Foley. He attended school until Grade 8, quitting at age 14 for a water boy position at a railway construction site.

Career 
Having started as a water boy, O'Brien was subcontracting for railroad work by the age of 18, then followed the new railways across the country during the early heyday of rapid railway expansion in Canada. He arrived in Renfrew, Ontario as a teenager and, in 1879, he and two partners won the contract to build the Kingston and Pembroke Railway (K & P). While walking the future rail path between Sharbot Lake to the town of Renfrew, he happened to meet the Barry family, including his future first wife, Jane "Jenny" Barry, where her father, James, had built their home on the south shore of Calabogie Lake. In 1891 he went bankrupt, after a disastrous contract for the Canada Atlantic Railway, then rebuilt his wealth through construction contracts.

While Commissioner of the Temiskaming and Northern Ontario Railway, from 1902 to 1905; O'Brien, in 1903, bought four claims that would become the O'Brien silver mine in Cobalt, Ontario from prospector Neil King for $4,000, then "promptly sued the owners of the adjacent LaRose claim for a piece of conflicting property." The La Rose claim had been bought from Fred La Rose by the Timmins and McMartin brothers; a protracted legal battle ensued between the "O'Brien crowd" and the "LaRose people", collectively, "The Big Cobalters", which "caught the Whitney government in the cross-fire," before a publicly profitable conclusion was devised by the Ontario government in 1906.

His influence in Renfrew and the surrounding area included a dairy, woolens and knit factories, and saw and planing mills. During World War I, O'Brien recruited and equipped several battalions of railway workers.

NHA 

Senator O'Brien's son, Ambrose, played varsity ice hockey at the University of Toronto; after graduation, Ambrose founded several hockey teams, financed by M.J., including teams in Cobalt, Haileybury, Montreal and Renfrew, which all played in the first season of the National Hockey Association (NHA), an organization co-founded by Ambrose in 1909, that became the forerunner of the National Hockey League. 

O'Brien funded four the NHA league's five teams, including the Renfrew Creamery Kings, founded by Ambrose, and popularly known as the Renfrew Millionaires because of O'Brien's definitive resource; the team was later renamed the Montreal Canadiens, "possibly the most storied franchise in Canadian sport."

He donated the O'Brien Cup to the league, which was used until 1950 by the National Hockey League and is in the collection of the Hockey Hall of Fame.

Legacy 
O'Brien was a financial supporter of the preservation of Renfrew's heritage buildings, including its opera house. He served as Senator for Ontario from 1918 to 1925. In 1926 he was made a Knight Commander of the Order of St. Gregory the Great, a decoration bestowed by Pope Pius XI. He died in 1940 in Renfrew.

See also 
 National Hockey Association
 Montreal Canadiens
 Renfrew Millionaires

References

External links 
 
 Who's who in Canada: An Illustrated Biographical Record of Men and Women of the Time, Volume 15, by Charles Whately Parker and Barnet M. Greene, International Press Limited, Canada,1912, page 1409.
 O'Brien, From Water Boy to One Million A Year, by Scott Young and Astrid Young, (George O'Brien, Editor), Ryerson Press, Toronto, Canada, 1967. .

1851 births
1940 deaths
Canadian businesspeople
Canadian senators from Ontario
Knights Commander of the Order of St Gregory the Great
Liberal Party of Canada senators